"Light" is a song by industrial rock band KMFDM from their 1993 album Angst. The single was first released in 1994 and contains nine different remixes of the song. "Light" peaked at No. 31 on the Billboard Dance/Club Play Songs Chart in May 1994. The single was re-released as a 7" in 2009, and the song was remixed and released as "Light 2010" on December 17, 2010.

Track listing

1994 CD release

1994 and 2014 12" release

2009 7" release

Light 2010

Personnel
Sascha Konietzko – vocals, bass, synths, programming, mixing
Günter Schulz – guitars
En Esch – vocals
Mark Durante – guitars
Dorona Alberti – vocals

Additional personnel
William Rieflin - additional guitars (2), additional drums (2)
Jim Marcus - additional programming (3, 9)
Jason McNinch - engineering (3, 9)
Matt Warren - assistant engineering (3, 9)
Trent Reznor  - mixing (4)
Dick Tater - drums (5)
Van Detta - additional programming (5)
Arron Leverenz - bass (6)
Burle Avant - mixing, production (6)
Eric Zimmermann - mixing, production (6)
Kevon Smith - guitar (8)
Liz Conant - keyboards (8)
Ron Gresham - mixing (8)
Vince Lawrence - additional programming (8)

Production
Chris Shepard – recording, engineering, mixing
Sam Hofstedt - assistant engineering (2, 5)
Chris Vrenna - assistant engineering (4)
Vince Lawrence - engineering (6, 8), mixing (8)

References

External links

[ allmusic.com] review at Allmusic

1994 singles
KMFDM songs
TVT Records singles
1994 songs
Wax Trax! Records singles
Songs written by Sascha Konietzko
Songs written by Mark Durante
Songs written by Günter Schulz
Songs written by En Esch
Songs written by Chris Shepard